Dangʻara is an urban-type settlement in Fergana Region, Uzbekistan. It is the administrative center of Dangʻara District. Its population was 7,983 people in 1989, and 11,500 in 2016.

References

Populated places in Fergana Region
Urban-type settlements in Uzbekistan